Bersarinplatz is a square in Friedrichshain, Berlin.

On 4 April 1895 the square was named Baltenplatz, after the Balts. However, on 31 July 1947, after World War II, the square was renamed Bersarinplatz after Nikolai Berzarin, the Russian Red Army General and former Commander of Berlin.

References

External links 

Squares in Berlin